The 2022 Senior League World Series took place from July 30–August 6 in Easley, South Carolina. Guayama, Puerto Rico defeated Norfolk, Virginia in the championship game. This was the first Senior Little League World Series held since the COVID-19 pandemic.

Teams

Results

United States BracketInternational BracketWorld Championship'''

References

Senior League World Series
Senior League World Series
Senior League World Series
Senior League World Series